Belize–Turkey relations are the foreign relations between Belize and Turkey.
Both countries are members of WTO. Turkey is an observer member of the ACS, OAS and SICA and Belize is a member.

The Embassy of Turkey in Guatemala City is accredited to Belize.

Historical Relations 
In the 1960s Turkey, along with the United States, sought and ultimately failed to mediate the resettlement of the border between Belize and Guatemala over contested Belizean territory dating back to an 1859 treaty between Imperial Spain and Great Britain.

High level Visits

Economic Relations 

Trade volume between the two countries was US$13.7 million in 2019 (Turkish exports/imports: 10.1/3.6 million USD).

See also 

 Foreign relations of Belize
 Foreign relations of Turkey

References 

 
Turkey
Bilateral relations of Turkey